Egg is a 2007 Turkish drama film directed by Semih Kaplanoğlu. The film is the first instalment of the Yusuf Trilogy, named after the eponymous lead character of the series, which includes Milk and Honey, filmed and released in reverse chronological order. It was shown Directors' Fortnight at the 60th Cannes Film Festival.

Plot
Poet Yusuf learns about the death of his mother Zehra and goes back to his hometown, Tire, where he had not been for years. In his mother's house, a young girl, his cousin Ayla, awaits him. Yusuf had not been aware of Ayla, who had been living with his mother for five years.

Ayla conveys to Yusuf Zehra's pledge to sacrifice a lamb after her death and tells Yusuf that he has to carry out his mother's wishes.  Gradually he succumbs to the memories in the house, and the rhythms of the town, its inhabitants, and the spaces filled with ghosts.

Yusuf and Ayla set off for a saint's tomb, a couple of hours away, for the religious sacrifice ceremony that his mother had pledged. Arriving after the herd from which they had planned to purchase a lamb has gone into the mountains to graze, they are forced to spend the night in a hotel by a nearby crater lake. A wedding ceremony held at the hotel brings Yusuf and Ayla closer.

Cast
Nejat İşler as Yusuf
Saadet Aksoy as Ayla
Ufuk Bayraktar as Haluk
Tülin Özen as woman in the bookstore
Gülçin Santırcıoğlu as Gül
Kaan Karabacak as peasant child
Semra Kaplanoglu as Zehra

Awards
2007 Valdivia International Film Festival - Best Director, Best Actress
2007 Sarajevo Film Festival - Best Actress, Heart of Sarajevo: Best Actress
2007 Antalya Golden Orange Film Festival - Best Picture, Best Screenplay, Best Camera Direction, Best Art Direction, Best Costume Design, Behlül Dal Digitürk Jury Special Award for Young Talent, NETPAC Jury Award for Best Picture
2007 World Film Festival of Bangkok - Best Director (Harvest of Talents competition)
2008 Istanbul International Film Festival - Golden Tulip, Radikal People's Choice Award
2008 Fajr International Film Festival - Best Director

References

External links

Golden Orange at TURSAK 
Kaplan Film 

2007 drama films
Greek drama films
Films set in İzmir
Films shot in İzmir
Films directed by Semih Kaplanoğlu
Golden Orange Award for Best Film winners
Turkish drama films
2000s Turkish-language films